The Montenegrin First League of Women's Handball is the top women's team handball league in Montenegro. It is organised by the Handball Federation of Montenegro.

History

Before independence
Since 2006, Montenegrin women's handball clubs played in the competitions of SFR Yugoslavia, FR Yugoslavia and Serbia and Montenegro. Most successful was ŽRK Budućnost Podgorica, who gained 18 champion titles in Yugoslav championship, with three European trophies (1985, 1986, 2006). Budućnost was most successful Yugoslav handball club, and except them, in the Yugoslav First League often played ŽRK Danilovgrad.
ŽRK Budućnost was the first Montenegrin team which participated in Yugoslav handball competitions for women. They debuted in the top-tier on season 1981-82 and soon after that begun era of their huge successes. After hard struggle with RK Radnički from Belgrade, ŽRK Budućnost won their first ever title on season 1984–85. Four years later, they won another title, defended next season. After the 1990-91 edition, finished with sensational trophy winning by ŽRK Lokomotiva Zagreb, team from Podgorica was the title holder in the last season of SFR Yugoslavia league (1991–92).
In FR Yugoslavia / Serbia and Montenegro, ŽRK Budućnost dominated during the every single season, so they won 14 consecutive titles (1992–93, 1993-1994, 1994–95, 1995–96, 1996–97, 1997–98, 1998–99, 1999-00, 2000–01, 2001–02, 2002–03, 2003–04, 2004–05 and 2005–06).

After independence
Soon after the Montenegrin independence referendum, Handball Federation of Montenegro founded its own competitions, with the First League as a top-tier competition for women. The league have two phases. In the first (regular season) participate six teams. Best three squads from regular season are qualifying for the final phase, together with ŽRK Budućnost Podgorica, who's not participant of the first phase.
During the history, ŽRK Budućnost was strongly dominant side, won every single trophy of national champion.
Except all domestic competitions, ŽRK Budućnost won the EHF Champions League on seasons 2011–12 and 2014–15, and EHF Cup Winners' Cup 2009-10.

EHF league ranking
EHF League Ranking for 2022/23 season:

5.  (6)  REMA 1000-ligaen (102.17)
6.  (4)  Liga Națională (94.50)
7.  (7)  Prva Liga (61.33)
8.  (9)  1. HRL (57.00) 
9.  (8)  Handball Bundesliga Frauen (56.33)

Champions
From the inaugural season (2006/07), ŽRK Budućnost Podgorica won all the champion titles in Montenegrin First League of Women's Handball.

Titles by season

Titles by Club

Montenegrin women's handball clubs in WRH League
Women Regional Handball League (WRHL) is founded on 2009, and Montenegrin clubs are participating from its inaugural season. As one of strongest European clubs, ŽRK Budućnost Podgorica dominated in the history of competition, often playing seasons without any defeat. So, ŽRK Budućnost won five titles during the six seasons of WRHL.
Below is list of participation of Montenegrin clubs by every season of WRHL.

Montenegrin women's handball clubs in European competitions

Montenegrin women's handball clubs are participating in the EHF competitions since the season 1984/85.

Honours
Montenegrin side ŽRK Budućnost Podgorica was extremely successful in the European Cups and today is among the best and most-trophied European and global women's handball teams. They are most successful Montenegrin sports team in European Cups, too. ŽRK Budućnost won six European titles, and among them are:
EHF Women's Champions League:
Winners: 2012, 2015
Women's EHF Cup Winners' Cup:
Winners: 1985, 2006, 2010
Women's EHF Cup:
Winners: 1987

All time list
Except ŽRK Budućnost, until today, representatives of Montenegro in women's EHF competitions were ŽRK Biseri Pljevlja, ŽRK Danilovgrad, ŽRK Nikšić and ŽRK Petrol Bonus Podgorica.
Below is the list of performances of Montenegrin women's handball teams in European competitions.

As of the end of EHF competitions 2018–19 season.

See also 
 Montenegrin women's handball clubs in European competitions
 Montenegrin Women's Handball Cup
 Women's EHF Champions League
 Montenegrin First League of Men's Handball

References

External links 
Handball Federation of Montenegro

First Women's League
Women's handball leagues
Women's sports leagues in Montenegro
Handball leagues in Montenegro